Timu may refer to:
 John Timu (American football) (born 1992), American football linebacker
 John Timu (rugby) (born 1969), former rugby footballer
 a ruler of the Northern state of Gonja, Ghana from 1983 to 1987
 Timu language